The 2017 Georgian Cup began on 1 March 2017 and ended on 2 December 2017. The winners of this season's cup (Chikhura Sachkhere) earned a place in the 2018–19 Europa League and will enter in the first qualifying round. 

Torpedo Kutaisi were the defending champions.

Format
For the 2017 season, the Georgian Cup was a single elimination tournament between 80 clubs. Level matches after regulation went to extra time and then to penalties, when needed, to decide the winning club.

First round
Twelve first round matches were played on 1 March 2017.

|}

Second round
Twenty-four second round matches were played on 5 March 2017.

|}

Third round
Twelve third round matches were played on 9–10 March 2017.

|}

Fourth round
Sixteen fourth round matches were played on 15 March 2017.

|}

Fifth round
Eight fifth round matches were played on 25–26 April 2017.

|}

Quarter–finals
The quarter-final matches were played on 12–13 September 2017.

|}

Semi–finals
The semi-final matches were played on 1 November 2017.

|}

Final

See also 
 2017 Erovnuli Liga
 2017 Erovnuli Liga 2

References

External links
 Official site 

Georgian Cup seasons
Georgian Cup
Cup